Brachydiplax is a genus of dragonflies in the family Libellulidae.
They occur in Asia from India to China and Southeast Asia, and New Guinea to Australia.

Species of Brachydiplax are often commonly found. Males of most species are usually pale to mid powder blue. Females have shades of brown, sometimes with neat patterns of spots on the abdomen, as in Brachydiplax chalybea flavovittata.

Like most Libellulids they tend to perch on sticks, reeds or stones near water, flying out to catch insects then returning to their perch.

Species
The genus Brachydiplax includes the following species:

References

Libellulidae
Anisoptera genera
Odonata of Asia
Odonata of Australia
Taxa named by Friedrich Moritz Brauer